This is a list of feature films originally released and/or distributed by Metro-Goldwyn-Mayer (to include MGM/UA Entertainment Co., MGM/UA Communications Co., MGM–Pathe Communications Co. and MGM/UA Distribution Co.).

This list does not include films from United Artists before it merged with MGM (except for co-productions), nor does it include other studios that MGM acquired (such as Orion Pictures, The Samuel Goldwyn Company, Cannon Films).

The pre-May 1986 Metro-Goldwyn-Mayer catalogue is owned by Warner Bros. Discovery through the Turner Entertainment Co.

Lists 
The films are divided into lists by decade: 
 List of Metro-Goldwyn-Mayer films (1924–1929)
 List of Metro-Goldwyn-Mayer films (1930–1939)
 List of Metro-Goldwyn-Mayer films (1940–1949)
 List of Metro-Goldwyn-Mayer films (1950–1959)
 List of Metro-Goldwyn-Mayer films (1960–1969)
 List of Metro-Goldwyn-Mayer films (1970–1979)
 List of Metro-Goldwyn-Mayer films (1980–1989)
 List of Metro-Goldwyn-Mayer films (1990–1999)
 List of Metro-Goldwyn-Mayer films (2000–2009)
 List of Metro-Goldwyn-Mayer films (2010–2019)
 List of Metro-Goldwyn-Mayer films (2020–2029)

See also
 List of United Artists films
 List of Orion Pictures films

 
Metro-Goldwyn-Mayer
Metro-Goldwyn-Mayer